Biehl is a German surname. Notable people with the surname include: 

Amy Biehl (1967–1993), American anti-apartheid activist murdered by a black South African mob
Dorothea Biehl (1731–1788), Danish playwright and translator
Janet Biehl (born 1953), writer associated with social ecology
João Biehl, Brazilian anthropologist and theologian
John Biehl (born 1939), Chilean lawyer, political scientist and politician

See also
Biel (disambiguation)
Biel (name), given name and surname
Beal (surname)